Synodus marchenae is a species of lizardfish that is found in the highest concentrations in the Southeast Pacific Ocean.

Environmental
Synodus marchenae is native to a marine environment. This species is known to be found in a demersal depth range within a tropical climate.

References

Notes
 

Synodontidae
Fish described in 1946